The Boys' pole vault at the 2017 World Youth Championships in Athletics was held on 16 July at the Moi International Sports Centre, Nairobi, Kenya.

Results 
Legend
– — Pass
O — Clearance
X — Failure
NM — No mark
DNF — Did not finish

References

2017 IAAF World U18 Championships